is a 1976 jazz album by Japanese pianist Ryo Fukui. It was Fukui's first release.

Reception
This album was virtually ignored in the United States, given that it was released at a time of reduced American interest in jazz. However, it was well appreciated by Japanese fans and critics alike. In the decades since Scenerys release, the album has earned greater critical praise. Fukui's dexterity and self-taught style has earned him comparison to such piano greats as McCoy Tyner and Bill Evans.

Track listing 
Side A:
 It Could Happen to You (Jimmy Van Heusen, Johnny Burke)
 I Want to Talk About You (Billy Eckstine)
 Early Summer (Hideo Ichikawa)
Side B: 
 Willow Weep for Me (Ann Ronell)
 Autumn Leaves (Joseph Kosma, Jacques Prévert)
 Scenery (Ryo Fukui)

Personnel 
 Ryo Fukui – Piano
 Satoshi Denpo – Bass
 Yoshinori Fukui – Drums

See also 
 1976 in jazz

References

External links 
 Official YouTube playlist

Ryo Fukui albums
1976 albums
Hard bop albums